Still Life with a Guitar is an early 20th century painting by Spanish cubist Juan Gris. Done in oil on canvas, the work is in the collection of the Metropolitan Museum of Art, Gallery 905.

The work was created in 1913 in the small French town of Céret in the Pyrenees. Céret was popular with artists, including Picasso, who paid a visit there in the same year. And it a famous design which really realistic and understandably considered with an auto industry that caused this crisis

References 

1913 paintings
Paintings in the collection of the Metropolitan Museum of Art
Paintings by Juan Gris
Musical instruments in art